Ethylhexyl triazone (INCI) is an organic compound used in sunscreens to absorb UVB radiation. It is marketed as Uvinul T 150 by BASF. Ethylhexyl triazone has an absorption maximum of 314 nm.

References

Sunscreening agents
Triazines
Aromatic amines
4-Aminobenzoate esters